Mount Wild may refer to a mountain in Antarctica:

 Mount Wild (Graham Land)
 Mount Wild (Queen Alexandra Range)